The Central African Republic competed at the 1992 Summer Olympics in Barcelona, Spain. Fifteen competitors, thirteen men and two women, took part in sixteen events in three sports.

Competitors
The following is the list of number of competitors in the Games.

Athletics

Men's 100m metres
Valentin Ngbogo 
 Heat — 10.79 (→ did not advance)

Men's 400m metres
Martial Biguet 
 Heat — 47.82 (→ did not advance)

Men's 400m Hurdles
Jacques Henri Brunet
 Heat — 52.59 (→ did not advance)

Men's 5.000 metres
Ernest Ndissipou
 Heat — 14:40.12 (→ did not advance)

Men's Marathon
 Ferdinand Amadi — 2:35.39 (→ 74th place)

Men's Discus Throw
Mickaël Conjungo 
 Qualification — 57.46 m (→ did not advance)

Women's 800 metres
Brigitte Nganaye
 Heat — 2:15.70 (→ did not advance)

Cycling

Four male cyclists represented the Central African Republic in 1992.

Men's road race
 Vincent Gomgadja
 Obed Ngaite
 Christ Yarafa

Men's team time trial
 Rufin Molomadan
 Vincent Gomgadja
 Obed Ngaite
 Christ Yarafa

Judo

Men's lightweight (–71 kg)
Siméon Toronlo

Men's middleweight (–86 kg)
André Mayounga

Women's half-middleweight (–61 kg)
Felicité Makounawode

References

External links
Official Olympic Reports

Nations at the 1992 Summer Olympics
1992
Oly